Henricus Wilhelm Vollaerts, known as Rik Vollaerts, (December 10, 1918 – March 15, 1988) was an American screenwriter. He wrote for Frank Sinatra's radio program. Vollaerts wrote for television programs including Bonanza, Leave It to Beaver, Rawhide, Voyage to the Bottom of the Sea, The Deputy, Wagon Train, Lawman, Highway Patrol, Death Valley Days and Mannix. He also wrote the episode "For the World Is Hollow and I Have Touched the Sky" of the science fiction television series Star Trek: The Original Series.

Vollaerts worked with screenwriter Maurice Richlin on the sitcom television series My Hero.

References

External links 

1918 births
1988 deaths
People from Mission Viejo, California
Screenwriters from California
American radio writers
American male screenwriters
American television writers
American male television writers
20th-century American male writers
20th-century American screenwriters